The Hedgehog (Le Hérisson) is a French film directed by Mona Achache, loosely based on the novel The Elegance of the Hedgehog by Muriel Barbery. Made in 2008, the film was released in theatres in 2009.

Plot
Paloma is an 11-year-old girl quietly and unhappily living in a luxurious Paris apartment with her family. She is intelligent and observant and, sensing disappointment and despair in adulthood, decides to end her life on her 12th birthday, which is 165 days away from when the story begins. Her father's old camera in hand, she records telling moments in the lives of the inadequate humans around her: her antidepressant-dependent mother, her moody sister, and petulant dinner guests. As Paloma prepares to finish her remaining days, Mrs. Michel, the gruff-looking, reclusive concierge, manages the building where Paloma and her family live. She hides her passion for literature from her bourgeois employers, but is found out by the new resident Mr. Ozu, widowed and Japanese, as a beautiful bibliophile in elegant disguise. A fiercely tender attraction grows between the three like-minded individuals, showing Paloma a more lovely side of life than she originally thought possible and forcing her to reconsider her plan of suicide.

Cast

Josiane Balasko - Renée Michel
Garance Le Guillermic - Paloma Josse
Togo Igawa - Monsieur Kakuro Ozu
Ariane Ascaride - Manuela Lopez
Anne Brochet - Solange Josse
Wladimir Yordanoff - Paul Josse
Sarah Lepicard - Colombe Josse
Valérie Karsenti - Tibère's mother

Critical reception
The film received positive reviews. Review aggregator Rotten Tomatoes reports that 88% of 67 critics gave the film a positive review, for an average rating of 7/10.

References

External links
Official site (Australia)
NeoClassics Films

Films about suicide
Films based on French novels
Films set in Paris
French drama films
2000s French films
Films directed by Mona Achache
Films with screenplays by Mona Achache